Chris Robinson (born November 5, 1938) is an American actor, screenwriter, and film director, sometimes credited as Christopher Robinson.

Career
Robinson began his career as an actor in the 1950s. Robinson was a young adult actor and stunt man and appeared in such films of the 1950s as Diary of a High School Bride and Beast from Haunted Cave. In the 1960s, he was cast as Flight Engineer and top turret gunner Technical Sgt. Alexander 'Sandy' Komansky on ABC's Twelve O'Clock High in the last two seasons. In 1972, he got the lead as a fanatical snakecharmer in the horror movie, Stanley.

Robinson played Rick Webber #2 on General Hospital from 1978 to 1986 where he was involved in a triangle with his wife Lesley Webber and the married Monica Quartermaine. Following this role, he joined Another World in late 1987 where he played the role of Jason Frame and was reunited with Denise Alexander who had played Lesley on "GH". Jason was murdered in early 1989. He then appeared on another soap opera, The Bold and the Beautiful as Jack Hamilton, joining in the early 1990s and leaving after three years. He last appeared in this part in 2005, having made several guest appearances over the years. Robinson returned to "GH" after a 16-year absence in 2002, only to see the character of Rick killed off in a controversial storyline that altered the back story. In 2013, he appeared in a 50th anniversary celebration episode as Rick's spirit, making peace with his old rival Alan Quartermaine when they both appeared to Monica and Alan's sister, Tracy.

In 1984, Robinson was a spokesman for Vicks Formula 44 cough syrup. The commercials aired on national television, and began with the quote "I'm not a doctor, but I do play one on TV". Robinson was replaced in the commercial by Peter Bergman after Robinson's legal difficulties.

Personal life
Robinson is the father of Taylor Joseph Robinson, cast as C.J. Garrison #3 in The Bold and the Beautiful.

In 1985, Robinson was convicted of income tax evasion. He was allowed to continue his role on General Hospital under a prison work-release provision.

Robinson is married to artist/actress Jacquie (née Shane) Robinson, and he has five sons from three previous marriages.

Credits

Actor

 Colt .45, ABC/Warner Brothers series, as the outlaw Tom Sanger in the episode "Appointment at Agoura" (1960)
 Dick Powell's Zane Grey Theater as Paul Martin in the episode "So Young the Savage Land" (1960)
 Bus Stop as Tony Maddox in the series premiere episode "Afternoon of a Cowboy" (1961)
 The Donna Reed Show as Ken in the episode "Military School" (1961)
 Hennesey as Larry Stander in the episode "The Hat" (1961)
 Two Faces West as Gordie in the episode "The Wayward" (1961)
 The Everglades, as Ralph Martin in the episode "Good Boy" (1961) and as Coley Jarrett in the episode "Young Osceola" (1962)
 The Detectives Starring Robert Taylor, 3 episodes, including as Grant Harper in the episode "Strangers in the House" (1961-1962)
 Outlaws, as Sonny Buck in the episode "The Daltons Must Die, Part 1" (1961)
 Sea Hunt as Kelsey in the episode "Crime at Sea" (1961)
 Straightaway, as Harkey in the episode "The Nobles Oblige" (1961)
 Empire as Arnold Koenig in the episode "A Place to Put a Life" (1962)
 Cain's Hundred as Jack Hayes in "The New Order" (1962) 
 The New Breed as Clifford Forbes in the episode "Walk This Street Lightly" (1962) 
 Combat! as Pvt. Paul Villette in the episode "Reunion" (1963)
  The Virginian as "Hank" in the episode "It Takes A Big Man" (1963), as Arnie "Dark Challenge" (1964), as Coley "Saddle Warmer" (1968), as Sandy "Experiment At New Life" (1970)
 The Alfred Hitchcock Hour, in "Forecast: Low Clouds and Coastal Fog" (January 18, 1963)
 The Dakotas as Chino in the episode "Red Sky Over Bismarck" (1963)
 The Wide Country as Gabriel Horn in the episode "Speckle Bird" (1963)
 Stoney Burke as Ross in the episode "A Girl Named Amy" (1963)
 Channing as Jim Wilson  in the episode "Beyond His Reach" (1963) 
 Gunsmoke as Willie Jett  in "The Bad One" (1963) 
 The Travels of Jaimie McPheeters as Billy Bird in the episode "The Day of the Skinners" (1963) 
 G.E. True as Holt in the episode "Ordeal" (1963)
 Arrest and Trial, two episodes (1963-1964)
 General Hospital (1963) TV Series as Dr. Rick Webber #2 (1978 – November 26, 1986; June 27 – August 9, 2002, April 2, 2013)
 The Fugitive (1963)"633 Squadron" as Wing Commander Grant (1964)
 Perry Mason (1965) in the episode "The Case of the Deadly Debt" 
 Twelve O'Clock High (1965–1967) as T/Sgt.Sandy Komansky (recurring role)
 Custer as Lt. Tim Rudford in episode "Accused" (1967)
 Felony Squad as Vincent Ludi in the episode "The Desperate Silence" (1967)
 The Invaders as Mike Calvin in the episode "The Organization" (1968)  
 Voyage to the Bottom of the Sea as Corpsman Mallory
 Hogan's Heroes as Karl Wagner in the episode "The Missing Klink" (1969)
 Cycle Savages (1969) as Romko
 Like a Mighty Army (1970) as Pastor D. James Kennedy
 Young Doctors in Love (1982) in cameo appearance
 Savannah Smiles (1982) as Richard Driscoll
 Amy (1981) as Elliot Medford
 Another World (1964) as Jason Frame (1987–1989)
 Like Father Like Son (1987) (uncredited) as Bobby
 Viper (1988) as James Macalla
 Rez Bomb (2009) as Jaws
 Yancey McCord: The KILLER That Arizona Forgot About (2020) as Yarnell Fritzowski

DirectorCatch the Black Sunshine (1972)Thunder County (1974) The Intruder (1975)Barnaby Jones - "Shadow of Guilt" (1976) episodeCannon - "A Touch of Venom" (1975) and "Point After Death" (1976) episodesBaretta'' - "Shoes" (1976) episode
The great balloon race (1977)
Director 
producer Paul Holm

References

External links 
 
 
 

1938 births
Living people
American male television actors
American male film actors
American people convicted of tax crimes
People from West Palm Beach, Florida
Male actors from Los Angeles
American male soap opera actors
20th-century American male actors
21st-century American male actors